Support Your Local Gunfighter is a 1971 American comic Western film directed by Burt Kennedy and starring James Garner and Suzanne Pleshette. The screenplay was written by James Edward Grant. The picture shares many cast and crew members and plot elements with the earlier Support Your Local Sheriff! but is not a sequel. It actually parodies Yojimbo and its remake A Fistful of Dollars, using the basic storyline of a stranger who wanders into a feuding town and pretends to work as an enforcer for both sides. The supporting cast features Jack Elam, Harry Morgan, John Dehner, Marie Windsor, Dub Taylor, Joan Blondell and Ellen Corby.

Garner later wrote that the film was, "not as good as Support Your Local Sheriff".

Plot
Latigo Smith, a gambler and confidence man, is traveling by train in frontier-era Colorado with the rich and powerful Goldie. Goldie wants desperately to marry him, a fate he wants to avoid. He hands the train's headwaiter a generous tip to assist him off the train without letting Goldie realize that he fleeing. He sneaks off the train at Purgatory, a small mining town.

He discovers that two mining companies, run by bitter rivals Taylor Barton and Colonel Ames, are vying to find a "mother lode" of gold buried somewhere nearby. Dynamite blasts periodically rock the town to its foundations.

Latigo consults the town doctor about an embarrassing problem that is not immediately revealed, but turns out to be a Goldie-related tattoo. Latigo's great weakness is a periodic uncontrollable urge to bet on roulette; he soon loses all of his money playing his "lucky" number, 23. Penniless, he starts romancing local saloon keeper Miss Jenny. Being mistaken for infamous gunslinger "Swifty" Morgan gives Latigo an idea. He talks amiable ne'er-do-well Jug May into impersonating Swifty. Latigo attracts the attention of Patience Barton, the hot-tempered daughter of Taylor (the townsfolk call her "The Sidewinder"), who desperately wants to escape her frontier existence, attend "Miss Hunter's College on the Hudson River, New York, for Young Ladies of Good Families", and live a life of refinement in New York City. When Latigo and Jug side with the Bartons in a dispute, Ames sends a telegram to the real Swifty Morgan, informing him of their deception.

Swifty arrives in town and immediately challenges the hapless Jug to a gunfight, but at the appointed time and place, Latigo is there in his place, sitting atop a donkey loaded with crates of dynamite. Swifty calls Latigo's bluff, but he is startled by the next mine explosion and accidentally shoots himself. The blast also panics the donkey, which charges into the Bartons' saloon. The dynamite explodes, blowing up the building, uncovering the mother lode, and removing Latigo's troublesome tattoo but leaving him otherwise uninjured.

Latigo finally wins big at roulette after betting $10,000 of the Bartons' money on number 23. From the back of a train taking Latigo and Patience to Denver to get married, Jug narrates the outcomes: Patience never does go to Miss Hunter's College, but her seven daughters do; and Jug goes on to become a big star in Italian Westerns.

Cast
 James Garner as Latigo Smith
 Suzanne Pleshette as Patience Barton
 Harry Morgan as Taylor Barton
 Jack Elam as Jug May
 John Dehner as Col. Ames
 Marie Windsor as Goldie
 Roy Glenn as Headwaiter
 Dick Curtis as Bud Barton
 Dub Taylor as Doc Shultz
 Joan Blondell as Jenny
 Ellen Corby as Abigail Ames
 Kathleen Freeman as Mrs. Martha Perkins
 Virginia Capers as Effie
 Henry Jones as Ez
 Ben Cooper as Colorado
 Grady Sutton as Storekeeper
 Pedro Gonzalez Gonzalez as Ortiz
 Gene Evans as Butcher
 Chuck Connors as "Swifty" Morgan (uncredited)

A. Also appeared in Support Your Local Sheriff!

Reception 
Support Your Local Gunfighter received mixed critical reviews. It holds a 62% rating on Rotten Tomatoes based on thirteen reviews.

See also
 List of American films of 1971

References

External links

 
 
 James Garner Interview on the Charlie Rose Show 

1971 films
1970s Western (genre) comedy films
American parody films
American Western (genre) comedy films
Films directed by Burt Kennedy
Films scored by Jack Elliott
1970s parody films
Films about roulette
United Artists films
1971 comedy films
1970s English-language films
1970s American films